Phase One of the Marvel Cinematic Universe (MCU) is a series of American superhero films produced by Marvel Studios based on characters that appear in publications by Marvel Comics. The phase began in 2008 with the release of Iron Man and concluded in 2012 with the release of The Avengers. Kevin Feige produced every film in the phase, alongside Avi Arad for Iron Man and The Incredible Hulk, with Gale Anne Hurd also producing The Incredible Hulk. The six films of the phase grossed over $3.8 billion at the global box office and received generally positive critical and public response.

Samuel L. Jackson appeared the most in the phase, starring or making cameo appearances in five of the Phase One films, while The Avengers actors – Robert Downey Jr., Chris Evans, Mark Ruffalo, Chris Hemsworth, Scarlett Johansson, and Jeremy Renner – signed contracts to star in numerous films. Marvel Studios created three short films for their Marvel One-Shots program to expand the MCU, while each of the feature films received tie-in or adaption comic books and tie-in video games. Phase One, along with Phase Two and Phase Three, make up The Infinity Saga.

Development
Marvel gained the film rights to Iron Man in November 2005 from New Line Cinema. In February 2006, Marvel announced that they had gained the film rights to Hulk from Universal, in exchange for letting Universal own the distribution rights to The Incredible Hulk and the right of first refusal to pick up the distribution rights to any future Marvel Studios-produced Hulk films. In April 2006, Thor was announced to be a Marvel Studios production. Soon after, Lions Gate Entertainment dropped the Black Widow project it had been working on since 2004, giving the rights back to Marvel.

Kevin Feige was named President of Production at Marvel Studios in March 2007 as Iron Man began filming. After the successful opening weekend of Iron Man in May 2008, Marvel announced that Iron Man 2 would be released on April 30, 2010, followed by Thor on June 4, 2010, The First Avenger: Captain America on May 6, 2011, and the team-up film The Avengers on July 15, 2011, which would feature Iron Man, the Hulk, Captain America, and Thor. In March 2009, Marvel adjusted their release schedule, moving Thor first to June 17, 2011 and later May 20, 2011, The First Avenger: Captain America to July 22, 2011, and The Avengers to May 4, 2012.

In January 2010, Thors release date moved once again, to May 6, 2011. That April, Marvel changed the title of The First Avenger: Captain America to Captain America: The First Avenger. On October 18, 2010, Walt Disney Studios Motion Pictures acquired the distribution rights for The Avengers from Paramount Pictures, with Paramount's logo and credit remaining on the films and on July 2, 2013, Disney purchased the distribution rights to Iron Man, Iron Man 2, Thor and Captain America: The First Avenger from Paramount. Edgar Wright's pitch for Ant-Man in 2006 helped shape the early films of the Marvel Cinematic Universe. Feige said some of the MCU was changed to "accommodate this version" of the film, as that version "helped to dictate what we did with the roster for Avengers the first time. It was a bit of both in terms of his idea for the Ant-Man story influencing the birth of the MCU in the early films leading up to Avengers."

Films

Iron Man (2008) 

Billionaire industrialist Tony Stark builds himself a suit of armor after he is taken captive by a terrorist organization. Free from his captors, he decides to upgrade and don his armor in order to hunt down weapons that were sold under the table.

In April 2006, Marvel hired Jon Favreau to direct Iron Man, with the writing teams of Art Marcum and Matt Holloway and Mark Fergus and Hawk Ostby writing competing scripts. Favreau consolidated both into one script, which was then polished by John August. Robert Downey, Jr. was cast in the title role in September 2006, after growing out a goatee and working out to convince the filmmakers he was right for the part. Principal photography began on March 12, 2007, with the first few weeks spent on Stark's captivity in Afghanistan, which was filmed in Inyo County, California. Production also occurred on the former Hughes Company soundstages in Playa Vista, Los Angeles, California, with additional filming at Edwards Air Force Base and Caesars Palace in Las Vegas, Nevada. Iron Man premiered at the Greater Union theater in George Street, Sydney, on April 14, 2008, and was released internationally on April 30, and in the United States on May 2.

The film ends with a post-credits scene featuring Samuel L. Jackson as Nick Fury, who approaches Stark regarding the "Avenger Initiative". Favreau said that he included the scene as "a little tip of the hat for the fans...a way to sort of tee up The Avengers." Jackson was only on set for a day, with a skeleton crew to avoid the news of his cameo leaking. Captain America's shield is also visible in the background of a scene; it was added by an ILM artist as a joke, and Favreau decided to leave it in the film.

The Incredible Hulk (2008) 

After being exposed to gamma radiation that causes him to transform into the monstrous Hulk, scientist Bruce Banner goes on the run and isolates himself from his love, Betty Ross. Hunted by the military, Banner seeks to cure himself and prevent his condition from being weaponized.

In January 2006, Marvel reclaimed the film rights for the Hulk character from Universal Pictures after Universal failed to meet a deadline to develop a sequel to director Ang Lee's 2003 film Hulk. Universal retained distribution rights for future Hulk films. Instead of moving forward with a sequel, Marvel hired Louis Leterrier to direct The Incredible Hulk, a reboot. Leterrier initially turned down the job out of respect for Lee, but later reconsidered and signed on. The script was written by Zak Penn, who drafted a treatment for the 2003 film. In April 2006, Edward Norton entered negotiations to portray Bruce Banner and rewrite Penn's script, although Penn received sole credit for the screenplay. Production began on July 9, 2007 and filming primarily took place in Toronto, with additional filming in New York City and Rio de Janeiro. The film premiered at the Gibson Amphitheatre on June 8, 2008, and was released on June 13.

The film takes place simultaneously with the events of Iron Man 2 and Thor, the former of which is set six months after the events of Iron Man. Downey briefly reprised his role from Iron Man as Tony Stark in a cameo appearance at the end of the film. Downey said that the filmmakers "were just cross-pollinating our superheroes. It happens to be a scene where I basically approach [actor William Hurt's character General Ross], and we may be considering going into some sort of limited partnership together. The great thing is he—and I don't want to give too much away—but he's in disrepair at the time I find him. It was really fun seeing him play this really powerful character who's half in the bag." In addition, Captain America is briefly seen frozen in ice in an alternate opening of the film, included in the DVD release.

Iron Man 2 (2010) 

After Tony Stark reveals himself to be Iron Man, the U.S. government demands he hand over his technology. Meanwhile, a rival industrialist and a Russian scientist conspire to use his own technology against him.

Immediately following the successful release of Iron Man in May 2008, Marvel Studios announced it was developing a sequel, Iron Man 2. Favreau returned as director and Justin Theroux was hired to write the screenplay, which would be based on an original story by Favreau and Downey. In October 2008, Downey signed a new four-picture deal, that retroactively included the first film, to reprise his role and Don Cheadle was hired to replace Terrence Howard as James Rhodes. Jackson signed on to reprise his role as Nick Fury from the Iron Man post-credits sequence in up to nine films, and Scarlett Johansson was cast as the Black Widow, as part of a multi-film commitment. Principal photography began April 6, 2009, at the Pasadena Masonic Temple in Pasadena, California. The majority of filming took place at Raleigh Studios in Manhattan Beach, California. Other locations included Edwards Air Force Base, Monaco, and the Sepulveda Dam. Iron Man 2 premiered at the El Capitan Theatre in Los Angeles, California on April 26, 2010, and was released internationally between April 28 and May 7 before releasing in the United States on May 7.

The film is set six months after the events of Iron Man, and takes place simultaneously with the events of The Incredible Hulk and Thor. The filmmakers continued to refer to other Marvel films by again including Captain America's shield. Favreau explained, "We introduced Captain America's shield briefly in one shot in the last film. So now it really was in his room, so we had to figure out how to deal with the reality that the shield was in his workshop." A scene toward the end of Iron Man 2 in a S.H.I.E.L.D. safe house contains several Easter eggs, ranging from footage from The Incredible Hulk displayed on a monitor to pointers on a map indicating several locales related to other Marvel films, including one pointing toward a region of Africa in reference to the Black Panther. A young Peter Parker appears as the child wearing an Iron Man mask whom Stark saves from a drone; the appearance was confirmed in June 2017 by Spider-Man actor Tom Holland, Kevin Feige and Spider-Man: Homecoming director Jon Watts. The film's post-credits scene shows the discovery of Thor's hammer in a crater.

Thor (2011) 

Thor, crown prince of Asgard, is banished to Earth and stripped of his powers after he reignites a dormant war. As his brother, Loki, plots to take the throne for himself, Thor must prove himself worthy and reclaim his hammer Mjolnir.

Mark Protosevich was hired to develop a script for Thor in April 2006, after the rights were acquired from Sony Pictures. In August 2007 Marvel hired Matthew Vaughn to direct the film, however he exited the project in May 2008. In September 2008, Kenneth Branagh entered into negotiations to replace Vaughn. In May 2009, Chris Hemsworth was in negotiations to portray the titular character, and Tom Hiddleston was set to play his brother, Loki. Both actors were contracted to star in several films. Marvel hired the writing team of Ashley Edward Miller and Zack Stentz to write a new script for the film, which was then rewritten by Don Payne. Production began on January 11, 2010 in Los Angeles, California, before moving to Galisteo, New Mexico in March. Thor had its world premiere on April 17, 2011 at the Event Cinemas theater in George Street, Sydney and a U.S. premiere on May 2 at the El Capitan Theatre in Los Angeles, California. The film was released internationally from April 21 to 30, and on May 6 in the United States.

The film takes place simultaneously with the events of The Incredible Hulk and Iron Man 2, the latter of which is set six months after the events of Iron Man. Clark Gregg, who appeared in Iron Man and Iron Man 2 as S.H.I.E.L.D. agent Phil Coulson, reprised the role in Thor. About his role in Thor he stated, "Agent Coulson was one of the guys who wasn't really in the comic books, and he [had] a very kind of small role in Iron Man. And I was just very lucky that they chose to expand that character and [chose] to put him more into the universe of it." After signing on to appear as Clint Barton / Hawkeye in The Avengers, Jeremy Renner made a cameo appearance as the character during a scene in Thor. Branagh said that they "were always going to have a guy in a basket above the action where Thor breaks in the S.H.I.E.L.D. camp", and that he was thrilled when the producers told him they wanted to use Renner's Hawkeye for that role. The film ends with a post-credits scene featuring Loki, watching as Erik Selvig and Nick Fury discuss the Tesseract. The scene was directed by Joss Whedon, who directed The Avengers. Stellan Skarsgård, who plays Selvig, said the scene was not included when he first read the screenplay for Thor, and that he was sent pages for the scene after agreeing to appear in The Avengers.

Captain America: The First Avenger (2011) 

In 1943, Steve Rogers is deemed physically unfit to enlist in the U.S. Army and fight the German Reich in World War II. Recruited for a secret military operation, he is physically transformed into a super-soldier dubbed Captain America and must battle the Red Skull, head of a Nazi science division known as Hydra.

In April 2006, Marvel hired David Self to write the script for a Captain America film. Joe Johnston signed on to direct in November 2008, and Christopher Markus & Stephen McFeely were hired to rewrite the script. In March 2010, Chris Evans was cast as Captain America and Hugo Weaving was cast as the Red Skull. Production began on June 28, 2010 in the United Kingdom, with locations in London, Caerwent, Manchester and Liverpool. The film premiered on July 19, 2011, at the El Capitan Theatre in Los Angeles, California, and was released in the United States on July 22, and in international markets starting July 27.

The Tesseract from the Thor post-credits scene appears as a MacGuffin in Captain America: The First Avenger. In the film, Dominic Cooper portrays a young Howard Stark, the father of Tony Stark, who hosts an early version of the Stark Expo, the fair Tony hosts in Iron Man 2. The final scene of the film includes a brief appearance by Jackson's Nick Fury followed by a teaser trailer for Marvel's The Avengers after the credits.

Marvel's The Avengers (2012) 

Nick Fury, the director of S.H.I.E.L.D., gathers the superheroes Iron Man, Thor, Captain America, the Hulk, Black Widow, and Hawkeye to fight Thor's brother Loki, who plots to subjugate the Earth.

Zak Penn, who wrote The Incredible Hulk, was hired to write a script for The Avengers in June 2007. In April 2010, Joss Whedon closed a deal to direct the film, and to rework Penn's script. Marvel announced that Edward Norton would not be reprising the role of Bruce Banner / Hulk, and in July 2010, Mark Ruffalo was cast in his place. Downey, Evans, Hemsworth, Johansson, Renner, Hiddleston, and Jackson reprised their respective roles from previous films. Principal photography began in April 2011 in Albuquerque, New Mexico, before moving to Cleveland, Ohio in August, and New York City in September. The premiere was held on April 11, 2012 at the El Capitan Theatre in Los Angeles, California, and the film was released in the United States on May 4.

Gwyneth Paltrow, who portrayed Pepper Potts in Iron Man and Iron Man 2, was included in the film at Downey's insistence. Prior to this, Whedon had not intended the film to include supporting characters from the heroes' individual films, commenting, "You need to separate the characters from their support systems in order to create the isolation you need for a team." Gregg also returns as Phil Coulson, along with Maximiliano Hernández as Jasper Sitwell from Thor. The supervillain Thanos appears in a mid-credits scene, portrayed by Damion Poitier.

Short films 

Marvel One-Shots are a series of direct-to-video short films that are included as special features in the MCU films' Blu-ray and digital distribution releases. They are designed to be self-contained stories that provide more backstory for characters or events introduced in the films.

Timeline 

During Phase One, Marvel Studios lined up some of their films' stories with references to one another, though they had no long-term plan for the shared universe's timeline at that point. Iron Man 2 is set six months after the events of Iron Man, and around the same time as Thor according to comments made by Nick Fury. The official tie-in comic Fury's Big Week confirmed that The Incredible Hulk, Iron Man 2, and Thor all took place within a week, a year before the crossover film The Avengers. Writers Chris Yost and Eric Pearson tried to follow the logic of the films' timeline when plotting the comic, and received "the seal of approval" from Feige and Marvel Studios on the final timeline. As promotion ahead of the release of The Avengers, Marvel released an official infographic detailing this timeline in May 2012.

The One-Shot The Consultant is set after the events of Iron Man 2 and The Incredible Hulk, with A Funny Thing Happened on the Way to Thor's Hammer set before the events of Thor and Item 47 set after The Avengers.

Recurring cast and characters

Music

Film soundtracks

Compilation albums

Singles

Home media 

A 10-disc box set titled "Marvel Cinematic Universe: Phase One – Avengers Assembled" was released on September 25, 2012. The box set includes all six films on Blu-ray and Blu-ray 3D, in a replica of Nick Fury's briefcase from The Avengers. In August 2012, luggage company Rimowa GmbH, which developed the briefcase for The Avengers, filed suit against Marvel Studios and Buena Vista Home Entertainment in U.S. federal court, complaining that "Marvel did not obtain any license or authorization from Rimowa to make replica copies of the cases for any purpose." The set was delayed to early 2013 for the packaging to be redesigned. The box set, with a redesigned case, was released on April 2, 2013. In addition, the box set included a featurette on the then-upcoming Phase Two films, showing footage and concept art, as well as previously unreleased deleted scenes from all of the Phase One films.

Reception

Box office performance 

The Avengers was the first film of the MCU to reach $1 billion.

Critical and public response

Accolades 
The films of the phase have been nominated for four Academy Awards, two BAFTA Awards, one Grammy Awards, thirty Saturn Awards (winning eight), three Hugo Awards (winning one), eleven MTV Movie & TV Awards (winning four), and eighteen Visual Effects Society Awards (winning three), among others.

Tie-in media

Comic books

Books 
In September 2015, Marvel announced the Guidebook to the Marvel Cinematic Universe, named as a nod to the Official Handbook of the Marvel Universe. The guidebooks are compiled by Mike O'Sullivan and the Official Handbook of the Marvel Universe team, with cover art from Mike del Mundo and Pascal Campion, and features facts about the MCU films, film-to-comic comparisons, and production stills. Guidebook to the Marvel Cinematic Universe: Marvel's Iron Man, Guidebook to the Marvel Cinematic Universe: Marvel's Incredible Hulk / Marvel's Iron Man 2, Guidebook to the Marvel Cinematic Universe: Marvel's Thor, and Guidebook to the Marvel Cinematic Universe: Marvel's Captain America: The First Avenger were released each month from October 2015 to January 2016, respectively.

Video games

References 

 
Phase 1